Steamed rice roll may refer to:

Bánh cuốn, a Vietnamese dish
Rice noodle roll, a Cantonese dish